Wanna Come In? is an MTV reality television show. It is a modern reality twist on Edmond Rostand's legendary 1897 play Cyrano de Bergerac. In the show, a two-man team that consists of a "stud" and a "dud" compete with another "stud"/"dud" duo to try to win cash prizes. The "stud" secretly coaches the "dud" by speaking through a hidden microphone while the "dud" is on a blind date with a beautiful young woman. Each team goes through several challenges in an effort to get the "geek" invited inside the woman's home at the end of the date. If she does not invite her "dud" inside, the team loses.

Wanna Come In? was on the air for three seasons on MTV. It was a half-hour show that aired daily in the afternoons. The challenges usually had the "geeks" doing zany things that would make it almost impossible for the date to end well. If the "geeks" ask to come in at the end of the date or reveal that he is being coached, the "geek/stud" duo are disqualified.

External links
 

MTV original programming
2004 American television series debuts
2004 American television series endings